The Browns Lane plant in Coventry, England was built as a Second World War shadow factory run by The Daimler Company Limited. In 1951 it was leased by Jaguar Cars and remained the company's home until 2005. It was the site of all Jaguar production until 1998, when production of the Jaguar S-Type commenced at the Castle Bromwich plant, which first produced Jaguar cars in 1977. It was also the firm's corporate headquarters and the home of the Jaguar Daimler Heritage Trust.

Jaguar's production at Browns Lane waned over the years, as new models were gradually assigned to Castle Bromwich Assembly in Birmingham and the former Ford Halewood Body & Assembly in Halewood, Liverpool. However, the core Jaguar XJ and XK ranges remained on the site until they were moved to Castle Bromwich in 2005.  Subsequently, the Browns Lane site housed just the headquarters and museum as well as 500 staff responsible for wood veneering for Jaguar, Aston Martin, and Land Rover.  Later, the headquarters moved to the Whitley plant, Whitley, Coventry but the Wood Shop (Veneer Manufacturing Centre), Museum and Pilot Build Workshop remained at Browns Lane.  Australian property firm Macquarie Goodman announced its purchase of Browns Lane in 2007. This marked the end of Jaguar’s presence at the site after more than 50 years.

The assembly halls were demolished in late 2008.

Current use

In 2010, a portion of the site was purchased by housebuilder Taylor Wimpey.

In 2012, the Browns Lane Jaguar Heritage Museum was demolished. The housing estate which took its place is known as "Swallow's Nest".

Jaguar's Pilot Plant continues in use. A new business park was built on the Browns Lane Plant site called "Lyons Business Park"; access to this site is from Coundon Wedge Drive.

References

Jaguar Cars
Former motor vehicle assembly plants
British shadow factories
Coventry motor companies
Buildings and structures in Coventry
Manufacturing plants in England
Motor vehicle assembly plants in the United Kingdom
Demolished buildings and structures in the West Midlands (county)
Demolished manufacturing buildings and structures
Buildings and structures demolished in 2008
2008 disestablishments in England